Aftalion is a surname. Notable people with the surname include:

Albert Aftalion (1874–1956), French economist
Amandine Aftalion (born 1973), French mathematician
Fred Aftalion (1922–2022), French chemical engineer